Dogmatic Infidel Comedown OK is an album of reworks and reinterpretations of tracks from IAMX's third studio album Kingdom of Welcome Addiction.

It includes remixes by Combichrist, Pull Out Kings, Alec Empire, Vive la Fête, Black Light Odyssey, Omega Man, Aesthetic Perfection and Terrence Fixmer; covers by Miss Derringer, James Cook and Anne Marie Kirby (The Dollhouse), German band Index, and Larry Driscoll; and Chris Corner's own reworks under the alias of UNFALL.

Background
"IAMX has been remixed in the past but I was never much involved in choosing the artists and somehow it always fell short of my expectations," says Corner.  "This is the first time I put my attention to it. Sometimes I am the child in the candy shop with all the tingling excitement, and sometimes my anti-industry-anti-people cynicism kicks in. But I had a feeling that I wouldn't be disappointed with this collection of oddballs."

Track listing

Tracks 14–16 are hidden tracks as part of track 13. Track 13 is 16:38 long.

References

External links
 US MP3 download.
 German CD.

IAMX albums
2010 remix albums